Charlotte Sullivan is a Canadian actress.

Career

Sullivan began acting professionally as a child. Her first on-screen role was an extra in a Liza Minnelli music video. She has had starring roles in the film Harriet the Spy (1996) and the CBS series The New Ghostwriter Mysteries (1997), as well as smaller parts in the films How to Deal (2003) and Fever Pitch (2005). Sullivan played Katie in the drama television series Across the River to Motor City (2007). She portrayed Maxima in the fourth episode of the eighth season of Smallville in October 2008. 

In 2010, Sullivan began portraying Officer Gail Peck in the police drama series Rookie Blue, which aired on Global in Canada and on ABC in the United States. In 2011, Sullivan appeared as Marilyn Monroe in the Canadian-American miniseries The Kennedys. She was nominated for a Canadian Screen Award for Best Supporting Actress for her role in the 2011 film Citizen Gangster.

In early 2021, she was cast as Detective Gina Cappelletti in the NBC series Law & Order: Organized Crime.

Personal life
Sullivan was born in Toronto, Ontario. Sullivan is married to Peter Stebbings. Their daughter was born in 2015.

Filmography

Film

Television

References

External links

 

Year of birth missing (living people)
20th-century Canadian actresses
21st-century Canadian actresses
Actresses from Toronto
Canadian child actresses
Canadian film actresses
Canadian television actresses
Living people